Kauko is a given name. Notable people with the name include:

Kauko Armas Nieminen (1929–2010), Finnish self-taught physicist
Kauko Hänninen (1930–2013), Finnish Olympic rower
Kauko Helovirta (1924–1997), Finnish film actor
Kauko Jalkanen (1918–2007), Finnish Olympic fencer
Kauko Mäkinen (1927–1968), Finnish ice hockey player
Kauko Nieminen (born 1979), Finnish Speedway racer
Kauko Pirinen (1915–1999), Finnish historian, professor in church history at Helsinki University
Kauko Röyhkä, (born 1959), Finnish rock musician and author
Kauko Salomaa (1928–2016), Finnish former speed skater
Kauko Wahlsten (1923–2001), Finnish rower

See also
Joni Kauko (born 1990), Finnish professional footballer

Finnish masculine given names